Don Xzaviar Jackson (born September 7, 1993) is an American professional gridiron football running back who is currently a free agent. He was most recently a member of the Hamilton Tiger-Cats of the Canadian Football League (CFL). He played college football at Nevada. Jackson was signed by the Green Bay Packers as an undrafted free agent in 2016, and has also been a member of the Calgary Stampeders.

College career
Jackson attended the University of Nevada, where he played on the Nevada Wolf Pack football team from 2013 to 2015 after playing one season and transferring from Iowa Western Community College.

Statistics

Professional career

Green Bay Packers
After going undrafted in the 2016 NFL Draft, Jackson signed with the Green Bay Packers on May 6, 2016. On July 25, 2016, he was released by the Packers. Jackson was signed to the Packers' practice squad on September 5, 2016. On October 20, 2016, he was promoted from the practice squad to the active roster after Packers running backs Eddie Lacy and James Starks suffered injuries the week prior. Jackson made his NFL debut against their NFC North rival Chicago Bears in Week 7 on the same day he was promoted. He finished the game with two rushes for six yards after leaving the game early with a left hand injury in the first half. On November 16, 2016, he was placed on injured reserve.

Jackson re-signed with the Packers on March 8, 2017. On May 1, 2017, he was released by the Packers after the team drafted three running backs.

Calgary Stampeders 
Jackson was a member of the Calgary Stampeders of the Canadian Football League (CFL) for two seasons starting in 2018. He played in 13 games for the Stampeders in his rookie season, rushing 160 times in his first season for over 900 yards and three scores. In his second season his playing time was limited by a concussion, and as a result he only played in seven games, carrying the ball 58 times for 246 yards.

Hamilton Tiger-Cats
Jackson signed a one-year deal with the Tiger-Cats on February 11, 2020. Following the cancelled 2020 season he signed a contract extension with the Hamilton Tiger-Cats on December 27, 2020. In two seasons in Hamilton Jackson played in 14 regular season games, carrying the ball 122 times for 544 yards with two rushing touchdowns. He also caught 40 passes for 321 yards and two receiving touchdowns. Injuries and the Canadian-American player ration limited his playing time in Hamilton. Jackson was released by the Ti-Cats on February 2, 2023, citing his desire to spend more time with his family.

Statistics

References

External links
 Hamilton Tiger-Cats bio
 Green Bay Packers bio
 Nevada Wolf Pack bio

1993 births
Living people
Players of American football from Sacramento, California
Players of Canadian football from Sacramento, California
Sportspeople from Elk Grove, California
American football running backs
Iowa Western Reivers football players
Nevada Wolf Pack football players
Green Bay Packers players
Calgary Stampeders players
Hamilton Tiger-Cats players
Canadian football running backs
American players of Canadian football